Washington Township is a township in Schuylkill County, Pennsylvania, United States. The population was 3,134 at the 2020 census.

History
The Schuylkill County Bridge No. 113 and Schuylkill County Bridge No. 114 are listed on the National Register of Historic Places.

Geography
According to the United States Census Bureau, the township has a total area of 31.1 square miles (80.5 km2), of which 31.0 square miles (80.4 km2)  is land and 0.1 square mile (0.2 km2)  (0.19%) is water.

Recreation
Portions of the Pennsylvania State Game Lands Number 80, through which passes the Appalachian National Scenic Trail is located in the southern portion of the township, and the eastern portion of the Sweet Arrow County Lake Park is located along the western border of the township.

Demographics

At the 2000 census there were 2,750 people, 1,001 households, and 785 families living in the township.  The population density was 88.6 people per square mile (34.2/km2).  There were 1,082 housing units at an average density of 34.9/sq mi (13.5/km2).  The racial makeup of the township was 99.09% White, 0.18% African American, 0.29% Asian, 0.04% Pacific Islander, 0.07% from other races, and 0.33% from two or more races. Hispanic or Latino of any race were 0.18%.

Of the 1,001 households 36.3% had children under the age of 18 living with them, 68.1% were married couples living together, 5.7% had a female householder with no husband present, and 21.5% were non-families. 17.4% of households were one person and 7.8% were one person aged 65 or older.  The average household size was 2.75 and the average family size was 3.11.

The age distribution was 26.1% under the age of 18, 8.8% from 18 to 24, 29.0% from 25 to 44, 24.5% from 45 to 64, and 11.6% 65 or older.  The median age was 38 years. For every 100 females there were 104.9 males.  For every 100 females age 18 and over, there were 102.6 males.

The median household income was $43,493 and the median family income was $46,964. Males had a median income of $35,089 versus $22,688 for females. The per capita income for the township was $17,269.  About 4.1% of families and 5.4% of the population were below the poverty line, including 3.7% of those under age 18 and 13.0% of those age 65 or over.

References

Townships in Schuylkill County, Pennsylvania